Per Ivar Roald (born 10 February 1970) is a retired Norwegian football defender.

He came through the youth ranks of Hødd, where he stayed throughout the club's 1995 Tippeligaen campaign.

He was also capped for Norway at youth level.

He later entered Hødd's board of directors.

He has also played soccer for the Cal Lutheran Kingsmen in 1993. Roald, a former member of the Norwegian national youth team, led the team with nine goals and seven assists in October 1993.

References

1970 births
Living people
People from Ulstein
Norwegian footballers
IL Hødd players
Norwegian First Division players
Eliteserien players
Association football defenders
Norway youth international footballers
Sportspeople from Møre og Romsdal